Mixtura is a genus of fungi in the family Phaeosphaeriaceae. It is a monotypic genus, containing the single species Mixtura saginata.

References

Phaeosphaeriaceae
Monotypic Dothideomycetes genera